John Bode "Bob" Osborn (April 17, 1903 – April 19, 1960) was an American professional baseball player and right-handed pitcher who appeared in 121 games pitched, 43 as a starter, for the Chicago Cubs and Pittsburgh Pirates in six seasons (– and –).

On May 17, 1927, Osborn was called into a game between the Cubs and Boston at Braves Field in the ninth inning of a 3–3 tie. He proceeded to throw 14 shutout frames of relief, allowing six hits and two bases on balls (and going 2-for-5 at the plate). The game was decided in the visitors' half of the 22nd inning, when Charlie Grimm put Chicago ahead with an RBI single. When Osborn retired Boston in order in the bottom half of the 22nd, he earned the 4–3 triumph.

In his six MLB seasons, Osborn compiled a 27–17 won–lost record, two saves, and 4.32 career earned run average. In 446 innings pitched, he allowed 528 hits and 181 bases on balls, with 140 strikeouts. He retired from baseball after the 1931 season.

He died in Paris, Arkansas, in 1960, two days after his 57th birthday.

References

External links

Griffith, Nancy Snell, Bob Osborne. Society for American Baseball Research Biography Project

1903 births
1960 deaths
Baseball players from Texas
Chicago Cubs players
Los Angeles Angels (minor league) players
Major League Baseball pitchers
People from San Diego, Texas
Pittsburgh Pirates players
Reading Keystones players